Safari is a 1999 Indian Hindi romantic adventure film directed by Jyotin Goel and starring Sanjay Dutt and Juhi Chawla. It is a remake of an Australian comedy Crocodile Dundee. Sanjay Dutt is the son of a former ship captain & is called Captain in his honor & lives a life full of adventure on a small island. Anjali (Juhi Chawla) wants to build a factory on the Island and meets Captain in this regard. Then begins their journey full of adventure, where Sanjay protects Anjali from goons and a wild Gorilla. Realizing his love for Anjali, Captain pursues her to Mumbai to try to woo her love. The story is a hilarious ride of their love and Captain's intentions to protect the beauty of his hometown.

Cast
Sanjay Dutt... Kishan "Captain" Jatin Khanna
Juhi Chawla... Anjali
Tanuja... Asha
Suresh Oberoi... Ajit Aggarwal
Mohnish Bahl... Shekhar Panchotia
Raza Murad... Father Felix
Sharat Saxena... Gwana
Sudhir... Uncle D'Silva
Avtar Gill... Police Inspector Avtar Singh
Sanjay Goradia... Johnson
Ghanshyam Rohera... Tiger (as Ghanshyam)

Music
Music of the film is given by Shyam-Mohan.

"Koo Koo Dil Yeh Bole" - Kavita Krishnamurthy, Kumar Sanu
"Tumse Mohabbat" - Kumar Sanu, Sadhana Sargam
"Yeh Safari" - Amit Kumar
"Aalaa Re Paaus Aalaa" - Alka Yagnik, Amit Kumar
"Kluk Kluk Kluk Koi Samjhaaye Mujhe" - Amit Kumar, Sadhana Sargam, Mohnish Behl
"Arre Tu Hai Kamaal" - Udit Narayan, Kavita Krishnamurthy

References

External links
 

Indian remakes of foreign films
1990s Hindi-language films
Films about crocodilians